WALF (89.7 FM) is a radio station  broadcasting a variety format. Licensed to Alfred, New York, United States, the station serves the Alfred area.  The station is owned by Alfred University.

History

WALF-FM started in November 1971 in the basement of 6 Sayles Street, and has since moved twice, to Steinheim in the mid-1970s, and then to its current location in the Powell Campus Center when it opened in 1993.

WALF-FM is run by student volunteers, and has a freeform genre - allowing the  student volunteer DJs to play what they want (within Federal Communications Commission regulations).  The students produce most of the programming from 9:00am–2:00am, with some programming including faculty and community members.

References

External links

Alfred University
ALF
Radio stations established in 1971
1971 establishments in New York (state)